Pontyberem Rugby Football Club is a Welsh rugby union team based in Pontyberem, Carmarthenshire. The club is a member of the Welsh Rugby Union and is a feeder club for the Llanelli Scarlets.

Club honours
1960-61 West Wales Cup Winners
1988-89 WWRU Section D Champions
1990-91 WWRU Section B Champions
1991-92 West Wales Cup Winners
1994-95 Welsh League Division 6 West - Champions
2003-04 WRU Division Three West- Champions
2008-09 WRU Division Three West- Champions
2014-2015 WRU Division 3 West A - Champions

References

Welsh rugby union teams
Sport in Carmarthenshire